Autacoids  or "autocoids" are biological factors (molecules) which act like local hormones, have a brief duration, and act near their site of synthesis. The word autacoid comes from the Greek words "autos" (self) and "acos" (relief; i.e., drug). The effects of autacoids are primarily local, though large quantities can be produced and moved into circulation. Autacoids may thus have systemic effects by being transported via the circulation. These regulating molecules are also metabolized locally. In sum, these compounds typically are produced locally, act locally and are metabolized locally. Autacoids can have a variety of different biological actions, including modulating the activities of smooth muscles, glands, nerves, platelets and other tissues.

Some autacoids are chiefly characterized by the effect they have on specific tissues, such as smooth muscle. With respect to vascular smooth muscle, there exist both vasoconstrictor and vasodilator autacoids. Vasodilator autacoids are released during periods of exercise. Their main effect is seen in the skin, where they facilitate heat loss.

These are local hormones; they therefore have a paracrine effect. Some notable autacoids are: eicosanoids, angiotensin, neurotensin, NO (nitric oxide), kinins, histamine, serotonin, endothelins and  palmitoylethanolamide.

In 2015, a more precise definition of autacoids was proposed: "An autacoid is a locally produced modulating factor, influencing locally the function of cells and/or tissues, which is produced on demand and which subsequently is metabolized in the same cells and/or tissues".

References

Biomolecules